The Gainesville metropolitan area is the metropolitan area in North Central Florida that includes Alachua, Levy, and Gilchrist counties, centered around Gainesville, Florida. The metropolitan area had a population of 339,247 in 2020.

The U.S. Office of Management and Budget designates the area as the Gainesville, Florida Metropolitan Statistical Area (MSA), a metropolitan statistical area used for statistical purposes by the United States Census Bureau and other government agencies. The Gainesville, Florida Standard Metropolitan Statistical Area was first defined in 1971, consisting of only Alachua County. In 1983 Bradford County was added to the MSA. Bradford County was removed from the MSA in 1993. Gilchrist County was added to the MSA in 2003. Levy County was added to the MSA in 2018.

As of 2020, the United States Census Bureau designated the Gainesville-Lake City, Florida Combined Statistical Area, consisting of the Gainesville, Florida MSA and the Lake City, Florida Micropolitan Statistical Area, which includes Columbia County.

As of 2020, the racial makeup of the MSA was 64.7% White, 16.7% African American, 0.3% American Indian or Alaskan Native, 5.4% Asian, 0.04% Native Hawaiian or Pacific Islanders, 3.4% some other race, and 9.4% from two or more races. Hispanics or Latinos of any race were 11.5% of the population.

Counties
Alachua
Gilchrist
Levy

References

 
Regions of Florida
Geography of Gainesville, Florida
Alachua County, Florida
Gilchrist County, Florida
North Florida